Christine Etiennette Pernette Jurine (1776–1812) was a Swiss scientific illustrator. She illustrated books written by her father, naturalist Louis Jurine, in particular Histoire des monocles qui se trouvent aux environs de Genève. She died at the age of 36 before this book was published, soon after the death of her invalid mother.
She also worked with François Huber in investigating the anatomy of bees. 
She has been referred to as Jurine's "accomplished daughter", who "faithfully portrayed [the Entomostraca], as seen by the microscope." (William Baird, as quoted by Damkaer, 2002).

She has been highly praised for her illustration. For example, the editors of Histoire... (as quoted by Damkaer, 2002) said of her:

References

External links

 Science Art: Fig 2. Monoculus quadricornis fuscus, a copepod female by Mlle. Christine Jurine, The Guild of Scientific Troubadours, February 10, 2019

1776 births
1812 deaths
Swiss illustrators
Swiss women illustrators
Scientific illustrators